Hemp Farming Act may refer to:

Industrial Hemp Farming Act of 2005
Industrial Hemp Farming Act of 2009
Hemp Farming Act of 2018